Mansukh Laxmanbhai Mandaviya (born 1 June 1972) is an Indian politician currently serving as the Minister of Health and Family Welfare and Chemicals and Fertilizers of India. He is also a Rajya Sabha member from Gujarat.

Early life 
Mansukh Mandavaiya was born in a small village named Hanol in Palitana Taluka of Bhavnagar district of Gujarat State. Born to a middle-class farmer family, (Patidar-patel-kurmi caste), he is the youngest amongst four brothers. He completed his primary education from the Government Primary School, Hanol and his high school studies from Songadh Gurukul.

After completion of HSC, he did a certificate course in Veterinary Live Stock Inspector and has been educated at Songadh Gurukul and Gujarat Agriculture University, Gujarat. He later completed his MA in political science from Bhavnagar University.

In 2021, Mandavia obtained a Ph.D. in political science from Gujarat Institute of Development Research.

Political career 
Mansukh Mandaviya is currently the Union Minister of Health and Family Welfare India and Chemicals and Fertilizers.

Positions served 
 2002-2007: Member of the Gujarat Legislative Assembly for Palitana
 2010: Chairman, Gujarat Agro Industries Corporation Limited
 2012-2018: Member of Rajya Sabha
 2013: State Secretary of BJP, Gujarat
 2015: Youngest General Secretary of BJP, Gujarat
 2016-2019: Minister of State for Ministry of Road Transport and Highways, Ministry of Shipping and Ministry of Chemicals and Fertilizers
 2018: Re-elected as Member of Rajya Sabha
 2019: Minister of State (Independent Charge) for Ports, Shipping and Waterways and Minister of State for Chemicals and Fertilizers
 2021: Union Minister of Health and Family Welfare India and Minister for Chemicals and Fertilizers

Gujarat state leader
He became a member of the Akhil Bharatiya Vidyarthi Parishad (ABVP) and soon became a State Executive Committee Member of ABVP, Gujarat Unit. He was appointed a leader of Yuva Morcha and then the President of BJP Unit of Palitana. Mr. Mandaviya also became the youngest Member of the Legislative Assembly (MLA) in Gujarat, when he was first elected in 2002. After his tenure, in 2010, he became the chairman of Gujarat Agro Industries Corporation Limited.

National politics
At the young age of 38, Mansukh Mandaviya was elected as a Member of Parliament (MP) in Rajya Sabha from Gujarat. He was appointed the Secretary for State Unit, BJP Gujarat, in 2013 and General Secretary in 2014. Later, in 2014, he was appointed the Gujarat State Incharge of BJP's High-tech & Mega Membership Drive Campaign.

MoS Road Transport and Highways, Shipping and Chemicals and Fertilizers 
On July 5, 2016, Mansukh Mandaviya was sworn in as the Minister of State for Road Transport and Highways, Shipping and Chemicals and Fertilizers, in the Government of India. He was re-elected for a second term as an MP in Rajya Sabha in March 2018.

In the Asian continent, he has visited China, Israel, Oman, Nepal, Dubai and Uzbekistan. He has also visited European countries including England, Germany and Hungary, along with South American countries such as Brazil and Argentina. The African continent has also been explored by Mr. Mandaviya, including countries of Kenya, Uganda, Tanzania, Rwanda, Algeria, Equatorial Guinea, Eswatini and Zambia. In an Oceania Region, he has visited New Zealand, Tonga, Fiji and Australia.

MoS Ministry of Ports, Shipping and Waterways
In May 2019, Mansukh Mandaviya took oath as a Minister of State in the Council of Ministers, Government of India. He was the Minister of State (Independent Charge) in the Ministry of Ports, Shipping and Waterways, along with being the Minister of State for Chemicals and Fertilizers. Mr. Mandaviya also represented India in the World Economic Forum at Davos, Switzerland in January 2020.

Minister of Health and Family Welfare and Chemicals and Fertilizers
Mansukh Mandaviya took charge as the Minister of Health and Family Welfare in the Government of India on July 7, 2021, with an additional charge of the Ministry of Chemicals and Fertilisers.

Awards and recognition
Mandaviya was honored by UNICEF for his contribution to women health-care initiatives and for distributing 10 crore sanitary napkins through Jan Aushadhi Kendras.

Initiatives 
 In 2004, he organized a 123 km long Padyatra, titled "Kanya Kelavani Jyot Padyatra" for the 'Beti Bachao, Beti Padhao' social campaign for 45 educational backward villages of his constituency.
 In 2006, he organized a 127 km Padyatra connecting 52 villages of his constituency with the title "Beti Bachao-Beti Padhao, Vyasan Hatao".
 As a part of the 150th Anniversary of Mahatma Gandhi's birth, Mandaviya undertook a 150 km long Padyatra. He started the Padyatra with tree plantation and explained the relation among the Gandhian thoughts and nature. He also flagged off the 22,000 km and 3-month long bike journey by three youngsters from Surat.

Personal life 
Mansukh Mandaviya is married to Neetaben Mandaviya and they have two children.

References

External links

 

1970 births
Living people
Rajya Sabha members from Gujarat
People from Bhavnagar district
Narendra Modi ministry
Bharatiya Janata Party politicians from Gujarat
Gujarat MLAs 2002–2007